Thomas "Tommy" Martyn (2 August 1946 – 6 November 2016) was an English professional rugby league footballer who played in the 1970s and 1980s.

Playing career

International honours
Tommy Martyn won caps for England while at Warrington in 1975 against Wales, in the 1975 Rugby League World Cup against France, and Wales (interchange/substitute), and in 1979 against Wales, and France, and while at Warrington was selected for Great Britain to go on the 1979 Great Britain Lions tour.

Challenge Cup Final appearances
Tommy Martyn played right-, i.e. number 12, (replaced by interchange/substitute Mike Nicholas) in Warrington's 7–14 defeat by Widnes in the 1975 Challenge Cup Final during the 1974–75 season at Wembley Stadium, London on Saturday 10 May 1975, in front of a crowd of 85,998.

County Cup Final appearances
Tommy Martyn played left-, i.e. number 11, and scored a try in Warrington's 26–10 victory over Wigan in the 1980 Lancashire County Cup Final during the 1980–81 season at Knowsley Road, St. Helens, on Saturday 4 October 1980, and played left- (replaced by interchange/substitute Platt) in Leigh's 8–3 victory over Widnes in the 1981 Lancashire County Cup Final during the 1981–82 season at Central Park, Wigan on Saturday 26 September 1981.

Player's No.6/John Player Trophy Final appearances
Tommy Martyn played left-, i.e. number 11, in Warrington's 9–4 victory over Widnes in the 1977–78 Players No.6 Trophy Final during the 1977–78 season at Knowsley Road, St. Helens on Saturday 28 January 1978, played right-, i.e. number 12, in the 14–16 defeat by Widnes in the 1978–79 John Player Trophy Final during the 1977–78 season at Knowsley Road, St. Helens on Saturday 28 April 1979, and played left-, i.e. number 11, and was man of the match in the 12–5 victory over Barrow in the 1980–81 John Player Trophy Final during the 1980–81 season at Central Park, Wigan on Saturday 24 January 1981.

Notable tour matches
Tommy Martyn played left-, i.e. number 11, in Warrington's 15–12 victory over Australia at Wilderspool Stadium, Warrington on Wednesday 11 October 1978.

Genealogical information
Tommy Martyn is the father of the rugby league footballer Tommy Martyn, and the younger brother of the Leigh and Great Britain rugby league  Mick Martyn.

References

External links
Warrington's World Cup heroes – Tommy Martyn
Statistics at wolvesplayers.thisiswarrington.co.uk

1940s births
2016 deaths
Batley Bulldogs players
England national rugby league team players
English rugby league players
Lancashire rugby league team players
Leigh Leopards players
Rugby league players from Leigh, Greater Manchester
Rugby league second-rows
Warrington Wolves players